Inapang is a Ramu language of Papua New Guinea. Dialects are Midsivindi, Itutang and Yigavesakama.

References

Tamolan languages
Languages of East Sepik Province
Languages of Madang Province